Northfield Junior-Senior High School is a 7-12 secondary school in Wabash, Indiana. It is one of three junior-senior high schools in the Metropolitan School District of Wabash County.

Demographics
The demographic breakdown of the 487 students enrolled in 2013-2014 was:
Male - 53.4%
Female - 46.6%
Native American/Alaskan - 0.6%
Asian/Pacific islanders - 0.6%
Black - 0.4%
Hispanic - 1.8%
White - 95.1%
Multiracial - 1.5%

35.9% of the students were eligible for free or reduced price lunch.

Athletics
The Northfield Norsemen compete in the Three Rivers Conference. The school colors are royal blue and grey. The following IHSAA sanctioned sports are offered:

Baseball (boys)
State champions - 2001, 2012
Cross country (girls & boys)
Football (boys)
Golf (girls & boys)
Softball (girls)
Tennis (girls)
Track (girls & boys)
Volleyball (girls)
Wrestling (boys)

See also
 List of high schools in Indiana

References

External links 

School district website

Public high schools in Indiana
Public middle schools in Indiana
Education in Wabash County, Indiana
Buildings and structures in Wabash County, Indiana